XHQRT-FM is a radio station on 90.9 FM in Querétaro, Querétaro. The station is owned by Respuesta Radiofónica and carries a pop format known as 91 DAT.

History
XHQRT began with a concession awarded on October 29, 1991 to José Visoso del Valle. The concession was ceded in 1996.

References

Radio stations in Querétaro